Hagens Berman Axeon is a UCI Continental cycling team based in the United States. The team has produced several North American, European and Antipodean riders who have gone on to compete professionally at a higher level: former members of the team include Ben King, Taylor Phinney, Jesse Sergent, Alex Dowsett, Lawson Craddock, George Bennett, Ian Boswell, Nate Brown, Joe Dombrowski, Carter Jones, Jasper Stuyven, Antoine Duchesne, Clément Chevrier, Ruben Zepuntke, Jasper Philipsen, Jhonatan Narváez, João Almeida and Tao Geoghegan Hart.

In April 2017 rider Chad Young died from injuries sustained in a crash at the Tour of the Gila.

In 2018 the team stepped up to UCI Professional Continental level before dropping back down to UCI Continental level in 2020.

Team roster

Major wins

2009
Individual Pursuit, UCI Track Cycling World Cup – Beijing, Taylor Phinney
UCI Track Cycling World Cup – København
Individual Pursuit, Taylor Phinney
1km Time Trial, Taylor Phinney
Individual Pursuit, UCI Track Cycling World Championships, Taylor Phinney
Prologue Flèche du Sud, Taylor Phinney
Paris–Roubaix Espoirs, Taylor Phinney
Stage 1 Tour of Southland, Jesse Sergent

2010
Individual Pursuit, UCI Track Cycling World Championships, Taylor Phinney
Stage 2b U23 Le Triptyque des Monts et Châteaux, Taylor Phinney
Stage 3 Tour of the Gila, Jesse Sergent
Stage 4 Tour of the Gila, Taylor Phinney
Overall Olympia's Tour, Taylor Phinney
Prologue, Stages 1, 2 & 6, Taylor Phinney
Lake Sunapee Criterium, Gavin Mannion
Paris–Roubaix Espoirs, Taylor Phinney
 National U23 Road Race Championships, Ben King
 European U23 Time Trial Championships, Alex Dowsett
Prologue Cascade Cycling Classic, Jesse Sergent
Stage 5 Cascade Cycling Classic, Alex Dowsett
 National Road Race Championships, Ben King
Chrono des Herbiers U23, Alex Dowsett

2011
 National U23 Road Race Championships, Michael Vink
Overall New Zealand Cycle Classic, George Bennett
Stage 2a Le Triptyque des Monts et Châteaux, Lawson Craddock
Stage 3 Tour of the Gila, Dale Parker
Stage 4 Tour of the Gila, Joseph Lewis
Stage 2 Highland Rim Classic, Nathan Brown
Overall Tour de Louisiana, Nathan Brown
Stages 1 & 2, Nathan Brown
Prologue Tour de Guadeloupe, Nathan Brown
Stage 8a Tour de Guadeloupe, Lawson Craddock
Stage 5 Giro della Valle d'Aosta, Joe Dombrowski
Nevada City Classic, Ian Boswell
Stage 3 Smith & Nephew/Marx & Bensdorf Gran Prix, Nathan Brown
 National U23 Time Trial Championships, Nathan Brown
John Venturi Memorial, Dale Parker
Stage 5 Giro della Valle d'Aosta, Joe Dombrowski
Stage 2 Hotter 'N Hell Hundred, Lawson Craddock
Stage 1 Tour of Tasmania, Dale Parker & Joshua Atkins
Christchurch–Akaroa, Joshua Atkins
Overall Tour of Southland, Joshua Atkins
Stage 5, Joshua Atkins

2012
Tour de New Braunfels, Gavin Mannion
U23 Time Trial, Vlaams-Brabant Provincial Championships, Jasper De Buyst
U23 Road Race, Vlaams-Brabant Provincial Championships, Jasper Stuyven
Stage 5 Tour of the Gila, Lawson Craddock
Overall Girobio, Joe Dombrowski
Stages 4 & 8, Joe Dombrowski
Meise–Wolvertem, Jasper De Buyst
Stage 3 Cascade Cycling Classic, Jasper Stuyven

2013
 National U23 Road Race Championships, James Oram
Nieuwrode Road Race, Jasper Stuyven
Overall Volta ao Alentejo, Jasper Stuyven
Stage 2, Jasper Stuyven
Stage 3 Arden Challenge, Gregory Daniel
Stage 2b Le Triptyque des Monts et Châteaux, Lawson Craddock
Overall Tour de Beauce, Nathan Brown
Stage 1, Jasper Stuyven
 National U23 Road Race Championships, Andžs Flaksis
 National U23 Time Trial Championships, Tanner Putt
 National U23 Road Race Championships, Nathan Brown
Overall Tour of Southland, James Oram
Stage 2, James Oram

2014
Stage 5 New Zealand Cycle Classic, James Oram
Overall San Dimas Stage Race, Clément Chevrier
Stage 1, James Oram
Stage 2 Tour of the Gila, Nicolai Brøchner
Walhain Road Race, Nathan Van Hooydonck
 National U23 Road Race Championships, Tanner Putt
Grand Prix Perwez Divertissement, Nathan Van Hooydonck
 National Track Championships (Team Pursuit), Alexander Darville
 National Track Championships (Points Race), Alexander Darville
Stage 1 Tour of Alberta, Ruben Zepuntke

2015
 U23 Time Trial Championships, James Oram
 U23 Cyclo-cross Championships, Logan Owen
Stage 1 Valley of the Sun Stage Race, Daniel Eaton
Overall GP Liberty Seguros, Ruben Guerreiro
Stage 2, Ruben Guerreiro
Stage 1 Volta ao Alentejo, James Oram
Stages 1 & 2 Iron Horse Classic, Keegan Swirbul
 U23 Road Race Championships, Keegan Swirbul
 U23 Time Trial Championships, Daniel Eaton
Stage 3 Tour of Utah, Logan Owen
Lakewood Cyclo-cross I, Logan Owen
Lakewood Cyclo-cross II, Logan Owen

2016
Stage 2 Chico Stage Race, Tyler Williams
Stage 2 Tour of Southern Highlands, Phil O'Donnell
Gran Premio Palio del Recioto, Ruben Guerreiro
Trofeo Banca Popolare di Vicenza, Tao Geoghegan Hart
Stage 3 Redlands Bicycle Classic, Neilson Powless
Liège–Bastogne–Liège U23, Logan Owen
Overall Joe Martin Stage Race, Neilson Powless
Overall Tour de Bretagne, Adrien Costa
Stage 4, Adrien Costa
Stage 7 An Post Rás, Eddie Dunbar
 Road Race Championships, Gregory Daniel
Overall Tour de Beauce, Gregory Daniel
Stage 3a (ITT), Neilson Powless
Stage 4 (ITT) Tour de Savoie Mont-Blanc, Adrien Costa
Stage 5 Tour de Savoie Mont-Blanc, Tao Geoghegan Hart
 U23 Time Trial Championships, Krists Neilands
 U23 Road Race Championships, Ruben Guerreiro
 U23 Time Trial Championships, Geoffrey Curran
 U23 Road Race Championships, Geoffrey Curran
Stage 4 Tour de l'Avenir, Adrien Costa
Stage 2 Hotter 'N Hell Hundred, Jonny Brown
Stage 8 Tour de l'Avenir, Neilson Powless
Stage 1 Tour of Alberta, Colin Joyce
Stage 1 (TTT) Olympia's Tour, Geoffrey Curran, Neilson Powless, Justin Oien, Gregory Daniel, Colin Joyce & Tyler Williams

2017
Stage 2 Clásico Virgen de la Purificación, Jhonatan Narváez
 National Track Championships (Individual Pursuit), Ivo Oliveira
 National Track Championships (Omnium), Ivo Oliveira
 National Track Championships (Points Race), Ivo Oliveira
Stage 4 Volta ao Alentejo, Logan Owen
Stage 3a (ITT) Le Triptyque des Monts et Châteaux, Neilson Powless
Stage 3 San Dimas Stage Race, Michael Rice
Fontana Mountainbike, Christopher Blevins
Tour of Flanders U23, Eddie Dunbar
 Overall Circuit des Ardennes, Jhonatan Narváez
GP Arjaan de Schipper, Chris Lawless
Gran Premio Palio del Recioto, Neilson Powless
Stage 5 Tour of the Gila, Jhonatan Narváez
Stage 3 Redlands Bicycle Classic, Michael Rice
Shrewsbury Grand Prix, Chris Lawless
Prologue Grand Prix Priessnitz spa, Ivo Oliveira
Stage 1 Giro Ciclistico d'Italia, Neilson Powless
Stage 3b Tour de Beauce, Chris Lawless
Stage 4 Tour de Beauce, Ian Garrison
Otley Grand Prix, Chris Lawless
 U23 Road Race Championships, Neilson Powless
Wales Open Criterium, Chris Lawless
 U23 Mountainbike Championships (XC), Christopher Blevins
Walpole Mountainbike, Christopher Blevins
Stage 4 Tour de l'Avenir, Chris Lawless
Póvoa da Galega, Ivo Oliveira
 National Road Race Championships, Jhonatan Narváez
Los Angeles U23 Cyclo-cross I, Christopher Blevins
Los Angeles U23 Cyclo-cross II, Christopher Blevins

2018
 National Track Championships (Omnium), Ivo Oliveira
 National U23 Cyclo-cross Championships, Christopher Blevins
 National Track Championships (Scratch Race), João Almeida
Dorpenomloop Rucphen, Mikkel Bjerg
Stage 2 San Dimas Stage Race, Christopher Blevins
 Overall Le Triptyque des Monts et Châteaux, Jasper Philipsen
Stages 1 & 2, Jasper Philipsen
Stage 3b Circuit des Ardennes, Ivo Oliveira
Liège–Bastogne–Liège U23, João Almeida
Stage 2 Tour of the Gila, Christopher Blevins 
Stage 4 Tour of the Gila, Michael Rice
Overall Redlands Bicycle Classic, Thomas Revard
Stage 1, Thomas Revard
Trofee Maarten Wynants, Jasper Philipsen
Stage 3 Giro Ciclistico d'Italia, Jasper Philipsen
Stage 6 Giro Ciclistico d'Italia, Sean Bennett
 U23 Time Trial Championships, Ivo Oliveira
 U23 Road Race Championships, Rui Oliveira
 Road Race Championships, Jonny Brown
Stage 4 Tour of Utah, Jasper Philipsen
Stage 4 Tour de l'Avenir, Mikkel Bjerg
Gylne Gutuer, Jasper Philipsen
 National Track Championships (Madison), Ivo Oliveira
 National Track Championships (Madison), Rui Oliveira
UCI World U23 Time Trial Championships, Mikkel Bjerg
 National Track Championships (1km Time Trial), Mikkel Bjerg
 National Track Championships (Individual Pursuit), Mikkel Bjerg

2019
Stage 1 Redlands Bicycle Classic, Sean Quinn
Stage 2 Redlands Bicycle Classic, Kevin Vermaerke
 Overall Le Triptyque des Monts et Châteaux, Mikkel Bjerg
 U23 Time Trial Championships, Ian Garrison
 Time Trial Championships, Ian Garrison
 U23 Road Race Championships, João Almeida
 U23 Time Trial Championships, João Almeida
Hafjell GP, Mikkel Bjerg
Chrono Champenois, Mikkel Bjerg
Liège–Bastogne–Liège U23, Kevin Vermaerke
UCI World U23 Time Trial Championships, Mikkel Bjerg
 National Track Championships (Individual Pursuit), Maikel Zijlaard
 National Track Championships (Team Pursuit), Maikel Zijlaard

2020
 U23 Road Race Championships, Jarrad Drizners
Stage 4 Tour of Southern Highlands, Michael Garrison

2021 
Clássica da Arrábida, Sean Quinn
 National U23 Time Trial Championships, Michael Garrison

2022
 Overall Istrian Spring Trophy, Matthew Riccitello

World, Continental & National Championships

2009
 UCI World Track (Individual Pursuit), Taylor Phinney

2010
 UCI World Track (Individual Pursuit), Taylor Phinney
 USA U23 Road Race, Ben King
 European U23 Time Trial, Alex Dowsett
 USA Road Race, Ben King

2011
 U23 Road Race, Michael Vink
 USA U23 Time Trial, Nathan Brown

2013
 New Zealand U23 Road Race, James Oram
 Latvia U23 Road Race, Andžs Flaksis
 USA U23 Time Trial, Tanner Putt
 USA U23 Road Race, Nathan Brown

2014
 USA U23 Road Race, Tanner Putt
 USA Track (Team Pursuit), Alexander Darville
 USA Track (Points Race), Alexander Darville

2015
 New Zealand U23 Time Trial, James Oram
 USA U23 Cyclo-cross, Logan Owen
 USA U23 Road Race, Keegan Swirbul
 USA U23 U23 Time Trial, Daniel Eaton

2016
 USA Road Race, Gregory Daniel
 Latvia U23 Time Trial, Krists Neilands
 Portugal U23 Road Race, Ruben Guerreiro
 USA U23 Time Trial, Geoffrey Curran
 USA U23 Road Race, Geoffrey Curran

2017
 Portugal Track (Individual Pursuit), Ivo Oliveira
 Portugal Track (Omnium), Ivo Oliveira
 Portugal Track (Points Race), Ivo Oliveiraira
 USA U23 Road Race, Neilson Powless
 USA U23 Mountainbike (XC), Christopher Blevins
 Ecuador Road Race, Jhonatan Narváez

2018
 Portugal Track (Omnium), Ivo Oliveira
 USA U23 Cyclo-cross, Christopher Blevins
 Portugal Track (Scratch Race), João Almeida
 Portugal U23 Time Trial, Ivo Oliveira
 Portugal U23 Road Race, Rui Oliveira
 USA Road Race, Jonny Brown
 Portugal Track (Madison), Ivo Oliveira
 Portugal (Madison), Rui Oliveira
 UCI World U23 Time Trial, Mikkel Bjerg
 Denmark Track (1km Time Trial), Mikkel Bjerg
 Denmark Track (Individual Pursuit), Mikkel Bjerg

2019
 USA U23 Time Trial, Ian Garrison
 USA Time Trial, Ian Garrison
 Portugal U23 Road Race, João Almeida
 Portugal U23 Time Trial, João Almeida
 UCI World U23 Time Trial, Mikkel Bjerg
 Netherlands Track (Individual Pursuit), Maikel Zijlaard
 Netherlands Track (Team Pursuit), Maikel Zijlaard

2020
 Australia U23 Road Race, Jarrad Drizners

2021
 USA U23 Time Trial, Michael Garrison

References

External links
 

UCI Professional Continental teams
Cycling teams established in 2009
Cycling teams based in the United States